Night Life is the debut EP by American New Jersey-based rap group the Outsidaz. It was released on January 18, 2000, via Rufflife Records. Audio production of the seven-track record was handled by Jim Jonsin, Ski, and few members of the band, with Chris Schwartz served as executive producer.

The album peaked at No. 67 on the Billboard Top R&B/Hip-Hop Albums chart and No. 19 on the Top Heatseekers chart. "The Rah Rah" was the lone single released from the album.

The record was dedicated to Outsidaz member Slang Ton who died in 1999.

Track listing

Personnel
Vocals

Tyree Smith (Axe) - rap (tracks 1, 4-7)
Aubrey King (Az Izz) - rap (tracks 4-5, 7)
Brian Bostic (D.U.) - rap (tracks 5, 7)
Denton Dawes (Denzy) - rap (tracks 5, 7)
Marshall Mathers (Eminem) - rap (track 4)
Nathaniel Longchamp (Nawshis) - rap (tracks 5, 7)
Jerome Hinds (PaceWon) - rap (tracks 1-2, 4, 6-7)
Rashia Fisher (Rah Digga) - rap (track 3)
Salih Ibn Al Bayyinah Scaife (Slang Ton) - rap (track 4)
Shakir Nur-al-din Abdullah (Yah Yah) - rap (tracks 6-7)
Dewayne Battle (Young Zee) - rap (tracks 1-4, 5, 3-7)
Vincent Carroll - additional vocals (track 5)

Technical credits

Chris Schwartz - executive producer
David Anthony Willis - producer
Eric "Ibo" Butler - recording
Ian Cross - mixing
James Schaffer - mixing, recording, producer
Jim Bottari - engineer
Ken Johnson - recording
Mike Goodchild - mixing, recording
Peter Jorge - mixing, recording
Warren Riker - mixing

Charts

References

External links

2000 debut EPs
Outsidaz albums
Albums produced by Jim Jonsin
Ruffhouse Records EPs